The Watts Point volcanic centre is a small outcrop of Pleistocene age volcanic rock at Watts Point in British Columbia, Canada, about  south of Squamish and   north of Vancouver, and just north of Britannia Beach. It is the southernmost volcanic zone in the Squamish volcanic field and of the Garibaldi segment of the Cascade Volcanic Arc. The latest research indicates that it is most likely a subglacial mound. It comprises a continuous mass of sparsely porphyritic highly jointed dacitic lava overlying the mid-Cretaceous Coast Plutonic Complex and overlain locally by clay and of glacial till.

Two railroad track ballast quarries, one near the middle and the other near the upper edge, provide the best exposure of the interior of the lava mass. BC Highway 99 climbs over the eastern shoulder of the complex before descending to the area of the Stawamus Chief and Murrin Park, south southeast of Squamish.

See also
 Cascade Volcanoes
 Garibaldi Volcanic Belt
 Volcanism of Canada
 Volcanism of Western Canada
 List of volcanoes in Canada
 Geology of the Pacific Northwest

References

External links
 Catalogue of Canadian volcanoes: Watts Point

Volcanoes of British Columbia
Subglacial mounds of Canada
Subduction volcanoes
Garibaldi Volcanic Belt
Sea-to-Sky Corridor
Pleistocene volcanoes